Kismat Ki Baazi is a 1980 Indian Hindi-language film directed by Bhappi Sonie, starring Sharmila Tagore, Mithun Chakraborty and Reena Roy in lead roles.

Cast

Sharmila Tagore
Mithun Chakraborty
Reena Roy
Prem Chopra
Jagdeep

References

External links

1980 films
1980s Hindi-language films
Films directed by Bhappi Sonie